Sigvard Kukk (born September 16, 1972 in Tallinn) is an Estonian cycling athlete. He placed 41st in mountain biking at the 2004 Olympic Games.

Achievements
2001
1. Mulgi Cycling Marathon winner
2. Otepää Cycling Marathon winner

2002
3. Elva Cycling Marathon winner 
4. Otepää Cycling Marathon winner
5. Tartu Cycling Marathon winner

2004
6. Elva Cycling Marathon winner

2007
7. Tallinn Cycling Marathon winner
8. Jõulumäe Cycling Marathon winner
9. Elion Estonian Cup overall 2nd place

References

External links
 http://www.cyclingarchives.com/coureurfiche.php?coureurid=10357

1972 births
Cyclists at the 2004 Summer Olympics
Olympic cyclists of Estonia
Estonian male cyclists
Living people
Sportspeople from Tallinn